Conor Meyler (born 22 September 1994) is a Gaelic footballer who plays for the Omagh St Enda's club and the Tyrone county team.

The COVID-19 outbreak in the Tyrone football squad twice delayed the 2021 All-Ireland Senior Football Championship semi-final against Kerry. Meyler later disclosed that he was one of the players who had tested positive for COVID-19 (despite having received two vaccinations), though he was asymptomatic.

Honours
Tyrone
 All-Ireland Senior Football Championship (1): 2021
 Ulster Senior Football Championship (3): 2016, 2017, 2021
 All-Ireland Under-21 Football Championship (1): 2015
 Ulster Under-21 Football Championship (1): 2015

Omagh St Enda's
 Tyrone Senior Football Championship (2): 2014, 2017

St Mary's University College
 Sigerson Cup (1): 2017 (c)

References

Living people
Tyrone inter-county Gaelic footballers
1994 births